Tower of Ra is a  pillar located in the Grand Canyon, in Coconino County of Arizona, US. Tower of Ra was named in 1879 by Thomas Moran, for Ra, the Egyptian deity of the sun. This followed the naming convention of Clarence Dutton who began the tradition of naming geographical features in the Grand Canyon after mythological deities. This mountain's name was officially adopted in 1906 by the U.S. Board on Geographic Names. The first ascent was made in 1977 by Jim Haggart, Art Christiansen, and Barbara Zinn. According to the Köppen climate classification system, Tower of Ra is located in a cold semi-arid climate zone.

Geology

The top of Tower of Ra is composed of the reddish Pennsylvanian-Permian Supai Group. Further down are strata of Mississippian Redwall Limestone, the Cambrian Tonto Group, and finally granite of the Paleoproterozoic Vishnu Basement Rocks at river level. Precipitation runoff from Tower of Ra drains south to the Colorado River via Crystal and Ninetyfour Mile Creeks.

See also
 Geology of the Grand Canyon area

References

External links 

 Weather forecast: National Weather Service

Grand Canyon
Landforms of Coconino County, Arizona
Mountains of Arizona
Mountains of Coconino County, Arizona
Colorado Plateau
Grand Canyon National Park
North American 1000 m summits